This is a list of statistical records of the Peru national football team.

Player records

Players in bold are still active with Peru.

Most appearances

Most goals

Competition records

FIFA World Cup

Copa América

Head-to-head results
As of 19 November 2022 after the match against .

References

Peru national football team
National association football team records and statistics